America Waldo Bogle (June 2, 1844 – December 28, 1903) was a pioneer in the Oregon Territory.  She and her husband, Richard Arthur Bogle, were among the first Black settlers in Walla Walla, Washington

Early life 
America Waldo was born in Missouri on June 2, 1844 and came to Oregon on one of the early wagon trains. There is no recorded information about her parents but it is believed her mother was a slave of one of the Waldo brothers that had moved from Virginia to Missouri, and there has been speculation she may have been the child of Daniel, Joseph, or John Waldo, which remains a debated topic among descendants, with particular emphasis on her birthdate. If she was born in 1844, as her tombstone and census records indicate, then she was born more than a year after Daniel had traveled to Oregon. Joseph traveled to Oregon in 1846 and John's widow traveled to Oregon with several African Americans in 1854. Whoever her birth father was, Daniel Waldo, a legislator in the Provisional Government of Oregon, "may have taken responsibility for raising her and thus acted as a father figure."

Marriage in Oregon 
In Salem, Oregon, on January 1, 1863, at the age of 18, America Waldo married Richard Arthur Bogle, a free Black man born in Jamaica. Their wedding was on the  same day that President Lincoln's Emancipation Proclamation went into effect. The wedding was controversial because there were both white and Black guests at the ceremony, going against racial segregation practices. Reverend Obed Dickinson, an abolitionist, presided over the marriage.  Daniel Waldo publicly supported the wedding and gave them "several gifts of great value with which to start their home."  Newspaper editor Asahel Bush called the wedding "shameful" in the local newspaper and in a letter to Matthew Deady he wrote, "It was a negro equality sentiment mixed up with a little snob-aristocracy." The Oregonian retorted to Bush's negative press coverage by saying, "the heart of a man who could be guilty of making light even of a poor mulatto girl's feelings is blacker than the skin of any African." News of the wedding traveled all the way to the San Francisco Bulletin, where it was written that the wedding included, "distinguished white ladies and gentlemen, who saw proper to witness the ceremony and participate in the festive proceedings." America and Richard had eight children together.

Walla Walla, Washington 
The Bogles moved to Walla Walla, Washington, where they started a 200-acre ranch.  America Waldo Bogle was known as "a lady of estimable character, noted for her deeds of charity to the poor and suffering."  Her three older children appear to have died between 1876 and 1878. She died in Walla Walla on December 28, 1903, and her husband died a year later on November 22, 1904. Her five surviving children out of an original eight were Arthur, Belle, Waldo, Katherine, and Warren Bogle, and the sons followed in their father's footsteps and became barbers. Her great-grandson, Richard "Dick" Bogle, was later the second African-American city commissioner in Portland, Oregon.

References

1844 births
1903 deaths
Farmers from Missouri
People from Walla Walla, Washington
Ranchers from Washington (state)
Oregon pioneers
Washington (state) pioneers
African-American history of Oregon
African-American history of Washington (state)
African Americans in the American Old West
People from Salem, Oregon